}}
Ashwani Kumar is an Indian bacteriologist and the Senior Principal Scientist at the Institute of Microbial Technology (ImTech). He is known for his studies on Mycobacterium tuberculosis, the causative agent of tuberculosis. His laboratory focuses on understanding the reasons for drug tolerance observed in humans. His laboratory hypothesizes that tuberculosis is a biofilm infection, so its treatment needs the administration of multiple drugs for at least six months. The Department of Science and Technology has awarded him Swarnajayanti Fellowship for 2016–2017. Department of Biotechnology has awarded him the National Bioscience Prize (2017-18). He was also selected for DBT/Wellcome Trust India Alliance Senior Fellowship (2021 to 2026). He was elected as a Fellow of the National Academy of Sciences, India, in 2022.

Biography 
Ashwani Kumar is a Senior Principal Scientist at the Institute of Microbial Technology (ImTech) where he heads a laboratory, popularly known as Ashwani Kumar's Lab. and serves as a principal investigator. He is known to have done extensive research on Mycobacterium tuberculosis and has served as a member of MDRIpred project, an open source server for predicting inhibitors against drug-tolerant M.tb H37Rv. He has published a number of articles; ResearchGate, an online repository of scientific articles has listed 31 of them. His laboratory has demonstrated the presence of cellulose encased biofilms inside the hosts including human. He also works on regulation of autophagy by signalling gases such as carbon monoxide and hydrogen sulfide. The Department of Biotechnology of the Government of India awarded him the National Bioscience Award for Career Development, one of the highest Indian science awards, for him contributions to biosciences, in 2017–18.

Selected bibliography

Articles 
 
 

 
Nisha Singh, Pallavi Kansal, Zeeshan Ahmad, Navin Baid, Hariom Kushwaha, Neeraj Khatri, Ashwani Kumar. Antimycobacterial effect of IFNG (interferon gamma)-induced autophagy depends on HMOX1 (heme oxygenase 1)-mediated increase in intracellular calcium levels and modulation of PPP3/calcineurin-TFEB (transcription factor EB) axis. Autophagy. 2018. doi: 10.1080/15548627.2018.1436936.

See also 

 Carotenoid
 Tissue culture

References

External links 
 
 
 

N-BIOS Prize recipients
Indian scientific authors
Year of birth missing (living people)
Indian biotechnologists
Indian cell biologists
Indian mycologists
Living people